Eucalyptus chartaboma, commonly known as paperbark gum, is a eucalypt that is endemic to Queensland. It is a medium-sized tree with soft, papery, fibrous bark on the lower trunk, smooth white to pale cream-coloured bark above, lance-shaped adult leaves, flower buds in groups of seven, orange-coloured flowers and oval to urn-shaped fruit. The flower buds and fruit have distinct ribs along their sides.

Description
The bark on the lower trunk is soft, fibrous and papery, brownish to white, smooth white to cream-coloured above. Flowering occurs between January and April and the flowers are orange.

Taxonomy and naming
Eucalyptus chartaboma was first formally described in 2000 by Dean Nicolle from a specimen collected north of Mount Garnet and the description was published in the journal Nuytsia. The specific epithet (chartaboma) is derived from the Ancient Greek words charte meaning "leaf of paper" and bomos meaning "base", "stand" or "altar", referring to papery bark on the trunk of this eucalypt.

Distribution and habitat
Paperbark gum usually grows on low hills and occurs in scattered locations near Croydon, Einasleigh and Mount Garnet, then as far north as Maitland Downs on the southern Cape York Peninsula.

See also
List of Eucalyptus species

References

Trees of Australia
chartaboma
Myrtales of Australia
Flora of Queensland
Plants described in 2000